Yan, known in historiography as the Later Yan (384 – 407 or 409) was a dynastic state of China ruled by the Xianbei people, located in modern-day northeast China, during the era of Sixteen Kingdoms.

All rulers of the Later Yan declared themselves "emperors".

Rulers of the Later Yan

See also
Battle of Canhebei
Wu Hu
List of past Chinese ethnic groups
Xianbei

References 

	

 
History of Mongolia
384 establishments
409 disestablishments
Dynasties in Chinese history
Former countries in Chinese history
4th-century establishments in China